David Boaz (born August 29, 1953, Mayfield, Kentucky) is the executive vice president of the Cato Institute, an American libertarian think tank.

He is the author of Libertarianism: A Primer, published in 1997 by the Free Press and described in the Los Angeles Times as "a well-researched manifesto of libertarian ideas." He is also the editor of The Libertarian Reader and co-editor of the Cato Handbook for Congress (2003) and the Cato Handbook on Policy (2005). He frequently discusses such topics as education choice, the growth of government, the ownership society, his support of drug legalization as a consequence of the individual right to self-determination, a non-interventionist foreign policy, and the rise of libertarianism on national television and radio shows.

Boaz's 1988 op-ed The New York Times on the high cost of the drug war fueled public debate over the decriminalization of drugs. His articles have also been published in The Wall Street Journal, The Washington Post, Los Angeles Times, National Review, and Slate. He has appeared on ABC's Politically Incorrect, CNN's Crossfire, NPR's Talk of the Nation and All Things Considered, Fox News Channel, BBC, Voice of America, Radio Free Europe, and other media. Boaz, a graduate of Vanderbilt University, is the former editor of The New Guard magazine and was executive director of the Council for a Competitive Economy prior to joining Cato in 1981.

Books
 Market Liberalism: A Paradigm for the 21st Century, Editor with Edward H. Crane, 1993. . 
 Libertarianism: A Primer, Free Press 1997. . 
 The Libertarian Reader, Editor, Free Press 1997. . 
 The Politics of Freedom: Taking on The Left, The Right and Threats to Our Liberties, 2008. . 
 The Libertarian Vote: Swing Voters, Tea Parties, and the Fiscally Conservative, Socially Liberal Center, with David Kirby and Emily Ekins, 2012. 
 The Libertarian Mind: A Manifesto for Freedom, Simon & Schuster, 2015.

References

External links
 
 Booknotes interview with Boaz on Libertarianism: A Primer, January 26, 1997.
 
 
 Archive at The Huffington Post
 Biography of David Boaz at Cato Institute
 David Boaz discusses the ownership society with Robert Siegel on NPR's All Things Considered
 David Boaz's entry "libertarianism" at the Encyclopædia Britannica
 "Deregulating Education" by David Boaz, in The Politic

1953 births
Living people
20th-century American male writers
20th-century American non-fiction writers
21st-century American male writers
21st-century American non-fiction writers
American book editors
American Freemasons
American libertarians
American male non-fiction writers
American political commentators
American political writers
Cato Institute people
American drug policy reform activists
HuffPost writers and columnists
Non-interventionism
People from Mayfield, Kentucky
Vanderbilt University alumni
Writers from Kentucky